During 2020 Madhya Pradesh political crisis, he supported senior Congress leader Jyotiraditya Scindia and was one of the 22 MLAs who resigned due to which Kamal Nath resigned from the post of Chief Minister of Madhya Pradesh, after he failed to convince the Rebel Congress MLAs, who were campaigning in a resort in Bengaluru.

See also
 2020 Madhya Pradesh political crisis

References

Living people
Indian National Congress politicians from Madhya Pradesh
Madhya Pradesh MLAs 2018–2023
People from Ashoknagar
Year of birth missing (living people)
Bharatiya Janata Party politicians from Madhya Pradesh